The 2003 Pocono 500 was the 14th stock car race of the 2003 NASCAR Winston Cup Series season and the 22nd iteration of the event. The race was held on Sunday, June 8, 2003, before a crowd of 100,000 in Long Pond, Pennsylvania, at Pocono Raceway, a 2.5 miles (4.0 km) triangular permanent course. The race took the scheduled 200 laps to complete. On the final round of pit stops on lap 190, Tony Stewart of Joe Gibbs Racing would cycle to the lead and hold off the field to win under caution when a crash occurred on lap 198 to give Stewart his 16th career NASCAR Winston Cup Series win and his first of the season. To fill out the podium, Mark Martin and Matt Kenseth of Roush Racing would finish second and third, respectively.

Background 

The race was held at Pocono Raceway, which is a three-turn superspeedway located in Long Pond, Pennsylvania. The track hosts two annual NASCAR Sprint Cup Series races, as well as one Xfinity Series and Camping World Truck Series event. Until 2019, the track also hosted an IndyCar Series race.

Pocono Raceway is one of a very few NASCAR tracks not owned by either Speedway Motorsports, Inc. or International Speedway Corporation. It is operated by the Igdalsky siblings Brandon, Nicholas, and sister Ashley, and cousins Joseph IV and Chase Mattioli, all of whom are third-generation members of the family-owned Mattco Inc, started by Joseph II and Rose Mattioli.

Outside of the NASCAR races, the track is used throughout the year by Sports Car Club of America (SCCA) and motorcycle clubs as well as racing schools and an IndyCar race. The triangular oval also has three separate infield sections of racetrack – North Course, East Course and South Course. Each of these infield sections use a separate portion of the tri-oval to complete the track. During regular non-race weekends, multiple clubs can use the track by running on different infield sections. Also some of the infield sections can be run in either direction, or multiple infield sections can be put together – such as running the North Course and the South Course and using the tri-oval to connect the two.

Entry list 

*Withdrew.

Practice 
Originally, three practice sessions were going to be held, with one session on Friday, and two on Saturday. However, rain on Saturday would cancel both Saturday practices.

The first and only practice session was held on Friday, June 6, at 11:20 AM EST, and would last for two hours.

Qualifying 
Qualifying was held on Friday, June 6, at 3:00 PM EST. Each driver would have two laps to set a fastest time; the fastest of the two would count as their official qualifying lap. Positions 1-36 would be decided on time, while positions 37-43 would be based on provisionals. Six spots are awarded by the use of provisionals based on owner's points. The seventh is awarded to a past champion who has not otherwise qualified for the race. If no past champ needs the provisional, the next team in the owner points will be awarded a provisional.

Two drivers would fail to qualify: Derrike Cope and Morgan Shepherd.

Full qualifying results

Race results

References 

2003 NASCAR Winston Cup Series
NASCAR races at Pocono Raceway
June 2003 sports events in the United States
2003 in sports in Pennsylvania